Lewis Morgan may refer to:

 Lewis Morgan (footballer) (born 1996), Scottish footballer
 Lewis Morgan (rugby union), Welsh rugby union player
 Lewis Morgan (Welsh politician) (died 1635), Welsh politician
 Lewis Morgan (Medal of Honor) (1836–1864), American Civil War sergeant 
 Lewis H. Morgan (1818–1881), American ethnologist, anthropologist and writer
 Lewis L. Morgan (1876–1950), U.S. Representative from Louisiana
 Lewis Render Morgan (1913–2001), U.S. federal judge
 Lewis V. Morgan (1929–2018), American judge, lawyer, and politician

See also
 Lew Morgan (1911–1988), Scottish footballer
 Llewellyn Morgan (1905–1979), Welsh footballer
 Morgan Lewis (disambiguation)